Dial 2244 is a 1968 Indian Malayalam-language film, directed and produced by R. M. Krishnaswamy. The film stars Prem Nazir, Sukumari, Adoor Bhasi and Rajasree. The film had musical score by G. K. Venkitesh.

Cast
Prem Nazir
Sukumari
Adoor Bhasi
Rajasree
N. Govindankutty
N. G. Menon
Sachu
Thodupuzha Radhakrishnan

Soundtrack
The music was composed by G. K. Venkitesh and the lyrics were written by P. Bhaskaran.

References

External links
 

1968 films
1960s Malayalam-language films
Films scored by G. K. Venkatesh